Ponticoccus gilvus  is a Gram-positive, aerobic, non-spore-forming and non-motile bacterium from the genus Ponticoccus which has been isolated from seawater from the Mara Island on Korea.

References 

Rhodobacteraceae
Bacteria described in 2008